Keep This Between Us is an American four-part television documentary series which premiered on August 29, 2022 on Freeform.

Production
On April 5, 2022, it was announced that Freeform had ordered the series, originally titled Dear Pony: Keep This Between Us which was originally set to premiere on June 15, 2022 before rescheduling to August 29.

Episodes

References

External links

2020s American documentary television series
2020s American television miniseries
2022 American television series debuts
2022 American television series endings
English-language television shows
Freeform (TV channel) original programming